Phnom Krom (lit. "downstream hill") is a 140 m high hill close to Siem Reap city, Cambodia. There is a temple on the top which derived its name from the hill, Prasat Phnom Krom.

Location
Phnom Krom is about 12 kilometers southwest of Siem Reap town.

Phnom Krom hill is very rocky; local legend has it that the rocks were exposed by the monkey general Hanuman during a hunt for medicine in the Ramayana epic. The area beyond the temple’s west gate affords views of the Tonle Sap lake.

Phnom Krom railway
Phnom Krom was at the southern end of the Phnom Krom railway, a narrow-gauge French colonial railway that was most likely constructed to take stone from the now-defunct quarries on Phnom Krom to Siem Reap.

Gallery

See also 
 Phnom Bakheng
 Phnom Bok

References

External links

Nick Ray, Cambodia

Mountains of Cambodia
Hindu temples in Siem Reap Province
Geography of Siem Reap province
Angkorian sites in Siem Reap Province